Orrin Fletcher was a member of the Wisconsin State Assembly.

Biography
Fletcher was born on April 15, 1877 in Burns, Wisconsin. He would become a farmer and President of a cooperative creamery and a cooperative telephone company.

Political career
Fletcher was elected to the Assembly in 1918. Additionally, he was chairman (similar to Mayor) of Burns and a member of the County Board of La Crosse County, Wisconsin. He was a Republican.

References

People from Burns, Wisconsin
Republican Party members of the Wisconsin State Assembly
County supervisors in Wisconsin
Mayors of places in Wisconsin
Farmers from Wisconsin
American cooperative organizers
1877 births
Year of death missing